Alexander Golitsyn or Alexander Golitzen may refer to:
 Alexander Golitzen (1908–2005), movie art director
 Alexander Mikhailovich Golitsyn (1718–1783), Russian field marshal and governor of Saint Petersburg
 Alexander Mikhailovich Golitsyn (vice chancellor) (1723–1804), son of general admiral Mikhail Mikhailovich Golitsyn
 Prince  (1773–1844), minister of education under Alexander I

See also
House of Golitsyn